Formal hall or formal meal is a meal held at some of the oldest universities in the United Kingdom and the Republic of Ireland (as well as some other Commonwealth countries) at which students usually dress in formal attire and often gowns to dine. These are held commonly in the colleges and halls of Oxford, Cambridge, Dublin, Durham, St Andrews, Bristol, London, the Australian sandstone universities (Adelaide, Melbourne, Queensland, Sydney, Tasmania, Western Australia), and Toronto. 

In a number of red brick universities, some halls such as those at Bristol, Leeds and Exeter, also practise similar traditions in order to increase interaction between academics and students, and to enrich the students' overall learning experience. Colleges of some Australian red brick universities, including the Australian National University, Monash University, the University of New England, the University of New South Wales and the University of Southern Queensland, also hold gowned formal dinners. 

The nature of 'formals' varies widely between the colleges and halls that hold them. In some colleges, formals may be held every night, and are simply a second sitting of hall at which gowns are worn and grace is read. In other colleges, formals may be special events to which guests from outside the college are frequently invited, often with themes and associated ents or "bops". In between these two extremes fall the great majority of colleges.

Terminology 
The full name and abbreviations to describe the formals differ. Generally, though, they are known as:
 Formal hall – common at Oxford, Cambridge, Royal Holloway and Durham
 Formal Meal or formal dinner – are also sometimes used, including at Leeds (Devonshire Hall)
 Common meal – subsidised collegiate meals at St Andrews
 Commons – Dublin (Trinity College)
 High table – Trinity College and Massey College in the University of Toronto.

Abbreviations of the above terms tend to be either formal or, at St John's College, Cambridge, hall. There are other circumstances in which different names are used. For example, some larger colleges have both a large dining hall and a canteen-style dining room (often called the buttery or servery). In these cases informal evening meals are taken in the buttery and formal meals in the hall, and the term hall is used uniquely to refer to the latter meal. Some may call it second hall to differentiate from the earlier self-service first hall or informal hall.

Traditions 
Some colleges/halls have elaborate traditions, while others are more relaxed. Grace may be said before the meal, in some places in Latin. A dress code of academic gowns at formals is compulsory at some colleges; in other cases formal wear (for example a lounge suit for men or equivalent for women) is required in addition to, or instead of, the gown. 

  

The tradition of "pennying" is long established in most Cambridge, Oxford, St Andrews and Durham colleges/halls, although is banned in some colleges, such as Keble College, Oxford and Pembroke, Cambridge whereas in others there is often the risk of possible expulsion from the meal by staff members and even fines at St Chad's College, Durham. A variation of the tradition is found at University College, Durham, where corks are used instead of pennies. In some Cambridge colleges, Smarties are used as an alternative, due to the request of the kitchen staff (pennies apparently being a problem in dishwashers).

Almost all Bristol, Durham, Leeds, St Andrews, Royal Holloway, Dublin, Oxford and Cambridge college formal halls include a high table, exclusively for the senior common room of the college and their guests, with students eating at the lower tables. The high table is often raised above the floor level of the hall, on a dais. Some of the newer colleges (e.g. Wolfson College, Cambridge, Wolfson College, Oxford,  Linacre College, Oxford) have discontinued or have never had this practice, in order to promote equality between fellows and students.

There may be one or more after dinner speakers at the end of the dinner or even between courses on special occasions.

See also 
 Informal hall
 Gaudy

References 

Academic meals
Terminology of the University of Cambridge
Terminology of the University of Oxford
Durham University
University of Bristol
University of Exeter